Mehrab Qasemkhani (born 7 December 1971) is an Iranian screenwriter, painter, set designer and actor.

Personal life

QasemKahni's brother is Peyman Qasemkhani, an Iranian painter, screenwriter, set designer and actor. Mehrab Qasemkhani earned both his Bachelors of Arts (BA) and Masters in Fine Arts (MFA) in painting from Islamic Azad University in Tehran.
 
He started his work as a set designer, costume designer and scriptwriter in 1996. He has been involved in writing screenplays and acting since then.
He married Shaghayegh Dehghan in 2002, but the couple separated in 2018. He has two children, Nirvana and Noyan Qasemkhani, from his former marriages.

Selected filmography

References

External links 

 
 

1971 births
Living people
Iranian screenwriters
Islamic Azad University, Central Tehran Branch alumni